The Music of Disney: A Legacy In Song is a 1992 three disc set of Disney songs spanning eight decades that were originally recorded from 1928 to 1991.

The collection is composed of hit songs and familiar favorites from films, television shows and theme parks including Snow White and the Seven Dwarfs, Pinocchio, Bambi, Cinderella, 101 Dalmatians, Beauty and the Beast, The Little Mermaid, DuckTales, The Mickey Mouse Club, and Walt Disney anthology television series. Released in 1992 by Walt Disney Records, it features such classics as "When You Wish Upon A Star", "Zip-A-Dee-Doo-Dah", "Someday My Prince Will Come", "Supercalifragilisticexpialidocious", "A Spoonful of Sugar", "Beauty and the Beast" and "It's A Small World (After All)".

The wide array of singers and performers include Julie Andrews, Dick Van Dyke, Burl Ives, Louis Prima, Maurice Chevalier, Angela Lansbury, Roger Miller, Helen Reddy, Bette Midler, Sean Connery, Kirk Douglas, Annette Funicello, Pearl Bailey and George Burns.

Certified as a gold-selling record by the RIAA in January 1993, it was certified as a platinum-selling recording in March 1995.

Track list

Disc One
1. "Turkey in the Straw": Steamboat Willie (1928) - Traditional

2. "Who's Afraid of the Big Bad Wolf?": The Three Little Pigs (1933) - Pinto Colvig/Mary Moder/Dorothy Compton/Billy Bletcher

3.  "Heigh-Ho": Snow White and the Seven Dwarfs (1937) - The Dwarf Chorus

4. "Whistle While You Work": Snow White and the Seven Dwarfs (1937) - Adriana Caselotti

5. "Someday My Prince Will Come": Snow White and the Seven Dwarfs (1937) - Adriana Caselotti

6. "When You Wish Upon a Star": Pinocchio (1940) - Cliff "Ukelele Ike" Edwards

7. "Give a Little Whistle": Pinocchio (1940) - Cliff Edwards/Dickie Jones

8. "Dance of the Reed Flutes": Fantasia (1940) - The Philadelphia Orch/Leopold Stokowski

9. "Baby Mine": Dumbo (1941) - Betty Noyes

10. "Love is a Song": Bambi (1942) - Donald Novis

11. "Little April Shower": Bambi (1942) - Amy Lou Barnes/Sally Mueller/Mary Moder/Alice Sizer/Betty Bruce

12. "Saludos Amigos": Saludos Amigos (1943) - Disney Studio Chorus

13. "You Belong to My Heart": The Three Caballeros (1944) - Dora Luz

14. "Zip-a-Dee-Doo-Dah": Song of the South (1946) - James Baskett

15. "Everybody's Got a Laughing Place": Song of the South (1946) - James Baskett/Jesse Cryor/Johnny Lee/Nicodemus Stewart

16. "The Lord is Good to Me": Melody Time (1946) - Dennis Day

17. "Lavender Blue (Dilly, Dilly)": So Dear to My Heart (1946) - Burl Ives

18. "A Dream Is a Wish Your Heart Makes": Cinderella (1950) - Ilene Woods

19. "Bibbidi-Bobbidi-Boo": Cinderella (1950) - Verna Felton/Ilene Woods/James McDonald

20. "I'm Late": Alice in Wonderland (1951) - Bill Thompson/Kathryn Beaumont

21. "The Unbirthday Song": Alice in Wonderland (1951) - Jerry Colonna/Ed Wynn/Kathryn Beaumont

22. "The Second Star to the Right": Peter Pan (1953) - The Jud Conlon Chor

23. "You Can Fly": Peter Pan (1953) - Bobby Driscoll/Kathryn Beaumont/Paul Collins/Tommy Luske

24. "Bella Notte": Lady and the Tramp (1955) - Bill Hamlin/Oliver Wallace

25. "Once Upon a Dream": Sleeping Beauty (1959) - Mary Costa/Bill Shirley

26." Cruella De Vil": One Hundred and One Dalmatians (1961) - Bill Lee/Lisa Davis/Ben Wright

27. "Higitus Figitus": The Sword in the Stone (1963) - Karl Swenson/Ricky Sorenson

Disc Two
1. "Supercalifragilisticexpialidocious": Mary Poppins (1964) - Julie Andrews/Dick Van Dyke/The Pearlie Chorus

2. "A Spoonful of Sugar": Mary Poppins (1964) - Julie Andrews

3. "Chim Chim Cher-ee": Mary Poppins (1964) - Dick Van Dyke/Julie Andrews/Karen Dotrice/Matthew Garber

4. "Winnie the Pooh": Winnie the Pooh and the Honey Tree (1966) - Disney Studio Chorus

5. "The Bare Necessities": The Jungle Book (1967) - Phil Harris/Bruce Reitherman

6. "I Wan'na Be Like You": The Jungle Book (1967) - Louis Prima/Phil Harris/Bruce Reitherman

7. "The Aristocats": The Aristocats (1970) - Maurice Chevalier

8. "Everybody Wants to Be a Cat": The Aristocats (1970) - Phil Harris/Scatman Crothers/Thurl Ravenscroft/Liz English

9. "The Age of Not Believing": Bedknobs and Broomsticks (1971) - Angela Lansbury

10. "Nobody's Problems": Bedknobs and Broomsticks (1971) - Angela Lansbury

11. "Oo-De-Lally": Robin Hood (1973) - Roger Miller

12. "Someone's Waiting for You": The Rescuers (1977) - Shelby Flint

13. "Candle on the Water": Pete's Dragon (1977) - Helen Reddy

14. "Best of Friends": The Fox and the Hound (1981) - Pearl Bailey

15. "Perfect Isn't Easy": Oliver & Company (1988) - Bette Midler

16. "Part of Your World": The Little Mermaid (1989) - Jodi Benson

17. "Under the Sea": The Little Mermaid (1989) - Samuel E. Wright

18. "Kiss the Girl": The Little Mermaid (1989) - Samuel E. Wright

19. "Be Our Guest": Beauty and the Beast (1991) - Jerry Orbach/Angela Lansbury

20. "Beauty and the Beast": Beauty and the Beast (1991) - Angela Lansbury

Disc Three
1. "A Whale of a Tale": 20,000 Leagues Under the Sea (1954) - Kirk Douglas

2. "Old Yeller": Old Yeller (1957) - Jerome Courtland

3. "Pretty Irish Girl": Darby O'Gill and the Little People (1959) - Sean Connery

4. "The Parent Trap": The Parent Trap (1961) - Tommy Sands/Annette Funicello

5. "Castle in Spain": Babes in Toyland (1961) - Ray Bolger

6. "Enjoy It": In Search of the Castaways (1962) - Maurice Chevalier/Hayley Mills

7. "On the Front Porch": Summer Magic (1963) - Burl Ives

8. "The Monkey's Uncle": The Monkey's Uncle (1965) - Annette Funicello

9. "That Darn Cat": That Darn Cat (1965) - Bobby Darin

10. "Fortuosity": The Happiest Millionaire (1967) - Tommy Steele

11. "Mickey Mouse March": The Mickey Mouse Club (1955) - The Mouseketeers

12. "I'm No Fool": The Mickey Mouse Club (1956) - Cliff "Ukelele Ike" Edwards

13. "You, the Human Animal": The Mickey Mouse Club (1956) - Cliff "Ukelele Ike" Edwards

14. "Mickey Mouse Club, Alma Mater": The Mickey Mouse Club (1955) - The Mouseketeers/Jimmie Dodd

15. "Wonderful World of Color" (Main Title): Walt Disney's Wonderful World of Color (1961) - The Wellingtons

16. "The Spectrum Song": Walt Disney's Wonderful World of Color (1961) - Paul Frees

17. "The Ballad of Davy Crockett": Davy Crockett (1955) - The Mellomen

18. "The Swamp Fox": The Swamp Fox (1959) - Leslie Nielsen

19. "The Wonderful World of Disney" (Main Title): The Wonderful World of Disney (1968) - George Bruns

20. "Zorro": Zorro (1957) - The Mellomen

21. "Strummin' Song": Walt Disney's Wonderful World of Color (1961) - Annette Funicello

22. "Mister Piano Man": The Golden Horseshoe Revie (1962) - Annette Funicello

23. "DuckTales Theme": DuckTales (1990) - Jeff Pescetto

24. "TaleSpin Theme": TaleSpin (1990) - Jim Gilstrap

25. "Meet Me Down on Main Street": Disneyland (1956) - The Mellomen

26. "The Tiki, Tiki, Tiki Room": Walt Disney's Enchanted Tiki Room (1963) - Wally Boag/Fulton Burley/Thurl Ravenscroft/The Mellomen

27. "It's a Small World (After All)": It's a Small World (1964) - The Disneyland Chorus

28. "Yo Ho (A Pirate's Life for Me)": Pirates of the Caribbean (1967) - The Mellomen

29. "There's a Great Big Beautiful Tomorrow": Carousel of Progress (1964) - Rex Allen

30. "Golden Dream": EPCOT Center (1982) - Richard Page/Marti McCall

31. "Main Street Electrical Parade": Disneyland (1979) - Jean Jacques Perrey/Gershon Kingsley

References

1992 compilation albums
Walt Disney Records compilation albums
Disney albums